Georg Mayr (Latin Georgius Marius) (1564–1623) was a Bavarian Jesuit priest and Hebrew grammarian.

Mayr spent most of career teaching Hebrew language. His Hebrew grammar (Augsburg, 1616) went through many editions and he published many Hebrew translations. Mayr also published the illustrated version of the catechism of Peter Canisius, and then translations into Greek (Ingolstadt 1595) and Hebrew (1620).

Works
 Hebrew New Testament, 1620
 Hebrew Grammar - Institutiones linguae Hebraicae, Augsburg, 1616
 Fasciculus Sacrarum Litaniarum

References

External links
 Biography
WorldCat page
CERL page

Translators of the New Testament into Hebrew
German Hebraists
16th-century German Jesuits
Grammarians of Hebrew
German male non-fiction writers